The 1910 Montana football team represented the University of Montana in the 1910 college football season. They were led by first-year head coach Robert H. Cary, and finished the season with a record of three wins, two losses and one tie (3–2–1).

Schedule

References

Montana
Montana Grizzlies football seasons
Montana football